Eporycta is a genus of moths of the family Xyloryctidae.

Species
 Eporycta chionaula Meyrick, 1920
 Eporycta hiracopis Meyrick, 1921
 Eporycta incanescens Meyrick, 1921
 Eporycta lurida Mey, 2011
 Eporycta pachnoscia Meyrick, 1915
 Eporycta tarbalea Meyrick, 1908

References

 
Xyloryctidae
Xyloryctidae genera